Andrew Jelks (born December 6, 1993) is a former American football offensive tackle. He played college football at Vanderbilt University, and was signed by the New England Patriots as an undrafted free agent after the 2017 NFL Draft.

College career
Jelks played in 24 games with 21 starts at Vanderbilt over the course of five seasons. Jelks missed his final two seasons in 2015 and 2016 due to injuries. He began his career at right tackle and moved to left tackle as a sophomore.

Professional career

New England Patriots
Jelks was signed by the New England Patriots as an undrafted free agent on May 5, 2017. He was placed on reserve/non-football injury list prior to the start of the season due to a torn ACL suffered during pre-season workouts his senior year at Vanderbilt, and would remain on the list for the entire 2017 season.

Retirement
Jelks announced his retirement on July 19, 2018.

References

External links
New England Patriots bio
Vanderbilt Commodores bio

1993 births
Living people
People from Paris, Tennessee
American football offensive tackles
Vanderbilt Commodores football players
New England Patriots players